This is a list of places on the Victorian Heritage Register in the Shire of Towong in Victoria, Australia. The Victorian Heritage Register is maintained by the Heritage Council of Victoria.

The Victorian Heritage Register, as of 2021, lists the following thirty-four state-registered places within the Shire of Towong:

References 

Towong
+
+